Christian Johannes Weltzer (4 February 1900 – 3 September 1951) was a Danish poet. In 1928 he won a bronze medal in the art competitions of the Olympic Games for his "Symphonia Heroica" ("Heroic Symphony").

References

External links
 profile
Dansk Forfatter Leksikon: Johannes Weltzer
Gravsted.dk: Christian Johannes Weltzer - dansk dikter
Danske Litteraturpriser - Johannes Weltzer (1900-1951)

1900 births
1951 deaths
Danish male poets
Olympic bronze medalists in art competitions
20th-century Danish poets
Medalists at the 1928 Summer Olympics
20th-century Danish male writers
Olympic competitors in art competitions